Our Lady of Apostles (OLA) College of Education (formerly OLA Training College) is a women's college of education in Cape Coast, Ghana.  It is one of 46 public colleges of education in Ghana and participated in the DFID-funded T-TEL programme. The principal is Dr. Mrs Regina Okyere-Dankwa.

The college is affiliated with the University of Cape Coast.

Education 
At the 8th congregation ceremony in 2015, 275 student teachers were awarded with a Diploma in Basic Education. The college during the diploma period  offered specialisations in Early Childhood Education, Science and Mathematics Education, and Social Science.
At the 14th Congregation in 2021, OLA College of Education recorded 40 First Class Honours for the last batch of Diploma in Basic Education Teacher-Trainees. 
OLA College currently runs 4-year Bachelor of Education programmes in Early Childhood (Early Grade) Education, Primary Education and Junior High School (JHS) Education.

History 
The Sisters of Our Lady of Apostles, a Catholic Missionary order, established the college in 1924. The college participated in the Sabre Trust's Fast-track Transformational Teacher Training programme in 2016.

Our Lady of Apostles (OLA) College of Education, formerly known as OLA Training College, is the premiere women's college in Ghana and the whole of Sub-Saharan Africa. It was established by the Missionary Sisters of Our Lady of Apostles (a Catholic Missionary Order). The College started in 1924 in a little room at Saint Mary's Convent School, Cape Coast when Rev. Mother Acquiline Tobin anticipated the need to train Ghanaian female teachers to help the white Sisters in running their convent schools. Thus, with the support of her Religious Order, Mother Acquiline began the training of four young Ghanaian ladies who had completed Middle school with an outstanding performance from OLA Girls Senior High School (Ho). Our Lady of Apostles College follows a holistic education model of educating the whole person, developing character, an entrepreneurial spirit, leadership potential, and spiritual growth.

To meet various teacher needs of the country, the college has run various pre-service teacher training programmes at different times.

 From 1926 to 1960 the College operated as a two-year certificate ‘B’ College.
 In 1960 a 4-year certificate ‘A’ teachers’ programme was started. A parallel two-year post ‘B’ programme was run alongside to upgrade certificate ‘B’ teachers to Certificate ‘A’
 Between 1968 and 1973 the College was charged to run a specialist home economics course to train teachers for the country's experimental junior secondary schools which were about starting.
 In 1975 the college embraced a new educational reform and introduced the three-year post-secondary teachers’ programme which became the focal point for the training of teachers for almost thirty years.
 In September 2002, a new Teacher Education Policy dubbed IN-IN-OUT was born, which followed a reform of upgrading teacher training colleges into diploma awarding institutions introduced in October 2004.

OLA College of Education received Institutional accreditation from the National Accreditation Board to run the following four programmes;

- 3-year Diploma in Basic Education general programme (regular).

- 3-year Diploma in Basic Education, Science and Mathematics programme (regular)

- 4-year Diploma in Basic Education by distance education (for non-professional teachers)

- 2-year Sandwich Diploma in Basic education (for Cert. ‘A’ teachers)

Currently, OLA College of Education has received an Institutional accreditation from Ghana Tertiary Education Commission (GTEC) to run the following programmes;

- 4-year Bachelor of Education in Early Childhood programme (regular).

- 4-year Bachelor of Education in Primary Education programme (regular).

- 4-year Bachelor of Education in Junior High School Programme (regular).

- 5-Semester (Sandwich) Bachelor of Education Degree in Basic education (for teachers with Diploma)

- 3-Semester Top-up (Sandwich) Bachelor of Education Degree in Basic education (for teachers with Diploma)

The college's student Population has grown considerably over the years. Their enrolment which rose to 280 in 1962 now stands at 1,387. The academic staff establishment is 62, made up of 30 female and 32 male tutors and the non-teaching supporting staff is 50. The college's growth has been dependent on its vision, determination, hard work and team management. The growth is reflected in the expansion of the College's physical plant made in recent years by the Government of Ghana through the Ministry of Education (Ghana), and with support from other development partners – Japan International Cooperation Agency(JICA), Arrownetworks, International Foundation for Education and Self Help (IFESH), UNESCO, Irish Aid and Mercy Education Fund (USA), and OLA Sisters International. Other physical development projects  include a thousand five hundred (1500) capacity Assembly Hall, an ultra modern Resource Centre, a Science complex, a modern Library complex, Lecture Halls and an ultra modern E-learning Centre. What strikes every visitor to the College is the impeccable cleanliness of the compound and halls of residence.

Achievements 
OLA College of Education is ranked among the top Colleges in the country, and her success story includes:

 fantastic turn out of quality teachers, heads of institutions, administrators, lawyers, skilled personnel, entrepreneurs, politicians, good and successful wives and mothers, among others during her eighty–two years of existence.
 impressive academic performance, adjudged the best college in the country.
 the first College ever to obtain overall external distinction in the Final Part II Examination.
 the first teacher training college to set up an ICT Learning laboratory with full internet connectivity, and a fully air conditioned and well-equipped E-learning centre to support independent learning and research.
 the first College to set up a website with a personalized domain name: www.ola.edu.gh, and to initiate the networking of her accounts department.
 OLA College of Education being the first all-female college to be accredited to run a specialist programme in Science and Mathematics. The College has established itself remarkably in the fields of academia, community service and sports.

See also 
List of colleges of education in Ghana

External links
 Information about OLA College of Education

References

Educational institutions established in 1924
Christian universities and colleges in Ghana
Colleges of Education in Ghana
1924 establishments in Gold Coast (British colony)